The International Journal of Quantum Information was established in 2003 and is published by World Scientific. It covers the field of quantum information science, with topics on areas such as quantum metrology, quantum cryptography, quantum computation, and quantum mechanics.

Abstracting and indexing 
The journal is abstracted and indexed in  Zentralblatt MATH, Science Citation Index Expanded,  CompuMath Citation Index,  Current Contents/Physical, Chemical & Earth Sciences, Inspec, and  Scopus.

References

External links 
 

Quantum mechanics journals
Publications established in 2003
English-language journals
World Scientific academic journals